The Nottingham Joint Station Committee was incorporated by the Great Central and Great Northern Railway Act 1897 to manage the railway station which was to become Nottingham Victoria.  The committee comprised representatives of the two railway companies to use the station: the Great Northern and the Great Central.

The committee was no longer required when both companies were grouped (with others) on 1 January 1923 to form the London and North Eastern Railway Company.

British joint railway companies
London and North Eastern Railway constituents